Nagraj Meena is a member of the Rajasthan Legislative Assembly from Dhariawad constituency.

References 

Rajasthan MLAs 2018–2023
People from Pratapgarh district, Rajasthan
Indian National Congress politicians from Rajasthan